Lieutenant-General Yuri Viktorovich Zhadobin (Belarusian: Юрый Віктаравіч Жадобін) was the Chairman of the KGB of the Republic of Belarus from 2007 to 2008 and the Minister of Defence of Belarus from 4 December 2009 to 27 November 2014. He replaced Leonid Maltsev and was succeeded by Andrei Ravkov. Zhadobin was subject to international sanctions as a person responsible for political repressions and human rights violations in Belarus.

Biography

Yuri Viktorovich Zhadobin was born on 14 November 1954 in Dnipropetrovsk, Ukrainian SSR.

In 1976, he was admitted to the Kazan Higher Tank Command School. In 1985, he joined the command department of the Military Academy of Armored Forces. In 1999, he was appointed Deputy Minister of Internal Affairs. In September 2003, he became the head of the Presidential Security Service. He was appointed chairman of the KGB on 17 July 2007. He served as the State Secretary of the Security Council from 2008 to 2009.

Accusations, international sanctions
As part of the international sanctions against the regime in Belarus following a crackdown of the opposition following the 2010 Belarusian presidential election, Zhadobin became subject to travel ban and asset freeze by the European Union as part of a list of Belarusian officials responsible for political repressions, vote rigging and propaganda.

In its 2012 decision, the EU Council stated regarding Zhadobin:
As a member of the Security Council, he approves the repressive decisions agreed at ministerial level, including the decision to repress the peaceful demonstrations on 19 December 2010. After December 2010, he praised the "total defeat of destructive forces", when referring to the democratic opposition."''

References

1954 births
Belarusian military personnel
Belarusian generals
Defence ministers of Belarus
Government of Belarus
Living people
Soviet lieutenant generals
Chairmen of the KGB of Belarus
Immigrants to Belarus
Military personnel from Dnipro